Raymond Tuaimalo Vaega (born 22 April 2000) is a New Zealand professional rugby league footballer who plays as a er for the Manly Warringah Sea Eagles in the NRL.

In round 24 of the 2022 NRL season, Vaega made his debut for the Manly Sea Eagles against the Canberra Raiders.

References

External links
Manly Warringah Sea Eagles profile

2000 births
New Zealand rugby league players
Rugby league wingers
Manly Warringah Sea Eagles players
Living people
Rugby league players from Sydney